Kenneth Donald Long (born July 24, 1953) is a former American football player. He played guard for the Detroit Lions of the National Football League (NFL) after playing college football at Purdue University. He was drafted by the Lions with the 44th pick of the second round of the 1976 NFL Draft. He did not sign a contract with the Lions until shortly before the 1976 preseason. He played 13 games for the Lions in 1976 and returned two kickoffs for 18 yards. He was placed on the injured reserve list before the 1977 season.

References

1953 births
Living people
American football offensive guards
Detroit Lions players
Purdue Boilermakers football players
Players of American football from Pittsburgh